Alice Tortelli (born 22 January 1998) is an Italian professional footballer who plays as a centre back for Serie A club ACF Fiorentina and the Italy women's national team.

Early life
Tortelli has two brothers, who are twins, and was born and raised in Florence. Tortelli started playing football for her brother Lapo's team. She played in defence alongside Lapo and both were often captain.

Career
She made her debut for the Italy national team on 22 September 2020 against Bosnia and Herzegovina, starting the match.

References

External links

 

1998 births
Living people
Women's association football defenders
Italian women's footballers
Italy women's international footballers
Fiorentina Women's F.C. players
Footballers from Florence
Serie A (women's football) players
ACF Firenze players
21st-century Italian women